21 Ranchhouse, located at 7570 Waha Road near Lewiston in Nez Perce County, Idaho, is a Queen Anne-style house built in 1886. It was listed on the National Register of Historic Places in 1978.

It is a 3-story house with a wraparound shed-roofed porch. A gambrel roofed frame barn built in 1921 is to the north.

The house is prominent, visible from several miles away, and is a local landmark.

References

Houses on the National Register of Historic Places in Idaho
Queen Anne architecture in Idaho
Houses completed in 1890
Nez Perce County, Idaho